Juan Ignacio Sirvent is a Spanish sailor. He competed in the Finn event at the 1968 Summer Olympics.

References

External links
 

Year of birth missing (living people)
Living people
Spanish male sailors (sport)
Olympic sailors of Spain
Sailors at the 1968 Summer Olympics – Finn
Sportspeople from Barcelona